Noellie Marie Béatri Damiba  (born December 31, 1951) is a Burkinabé journalist and diplomat.

Damiba was born in Koupéla. From 1994 to 2003 she was the Ambassador of Burkina Faso in Rome, Italy. From 2003 to 2008 she was the Ambassador of Burkina Faso in Vienna, Austria.

References

External links
Biography at La Petite Academie 

Burkinabé journalists
1951 births
Living people
Ambassadors of Burkina Faso to Austria
Ambassadors of Burkina Faso to Italy
Burkinabé women ambassadors
People from Centre-Est Region
21st-century Burkinabé people